The tenth season of the police procedural/legal drama, Law & Order: Special Victims Unit premiered September 23, 2008, and ended June 2, 2009, on NBC. It was the last season of the show to occupy the Tuesday 10pm/9c timeslot.

Production
The tenth season introduced writer Daniel Truly to SVU. He became a vocal correspondent about the production and was the first to comment on the appropriateness of Ice-T's casting in the show given the alleged misogyny in his music. Truly was used to programs that included frequent meetings with other writers and said "In some ways it's slightly lonelier" on SVU.

The making of the episode "Lunacy" was covered in detail by authors Susan Green and Randee Dawn. The episode, which filmed between July 14 and July 28, 2008, contained a scene in which detectives watch footage of an astronaut on board the International Space Station. In order to film the weightless scene, Kristina Klebe was harnessed into cables which were later edited out. Members of the production staff appeared as astronauts in a still picture. Another scene involved a fight between Detective Stabler and James Brolin's character. A table made of balsa wood and breakaway glass was used in this scene so that it could be broken easily. Early in "Lunacy", detectives learn that their evidence is degraded due to eels feasting on the body. Prop master Anthony Munafo mentioned that he spent eight hours finding a pet store that would sell them enough eels of the right size.

A later episode "Hell" condemned the activities of the Lord's Resistance Army in Uganda. Executive producer Neal Baer collaborated with the Enough Project to portray child soldiers truthfully and called the episode part of a "continuing commitment to bring the audience stories that resonate with timely social issues." The filming of "Hell" marked the first on-location use of the United Nations building in a television episode.

During the tenth season, the director of photography, George Pattison, expressed his desire to continue using 35mm film. He said "Ours is one of the last shows doing that ... Despite pressure from above to save money, Dick Wolf and our creative producers insist on sticking with a proven formula. Whether it's 100 or 0 degrees outside, these cameras work. And they give beautiful latitude compared with digital." Law & Order: Special Victims Unit continued using motion picture cameras for another two years but ultimately switched to digital for Season 13.

Cast changes and returning characters
The unit's new Assistant District Attorney, Kim Greylek, played by Michaela McManus, began appearing in the season premiere.  About the role, McManus said, "It's really tricky. This character has a lot of brain power and her vocabulary is different than mine." Despite appearing in the opening credits for every Season 10 episode, McManus’ role only last half the season. Neal Baer explained that "Sometimes the part and the actor just don't mesh." Stephanie March began reprising her role of ADA Alexandra Cabot in the same episode. Until "Lead", Stephanie March's last appearance as ADA Cabot was in the spin-off series Conviction. However, her last SVU appearance was in the sixth season which depicted her as still living in hiding. When asked if her reintroduction to SVU would finally explain how she got out of the witness protection program, March answered "I think this will be nice and neat and make sense." The episode was dedicated to deceased crew member Dennis Radesky.

The season finale "Zebras" was the last episode to feature Mike Doyle. His recurring character Ryan O'Halloran is killed after appearing in every season since the fifth. Neal Baer, who wanted to "explore characters' reactions to a death in an interesting way" decided to kill off the character and informed Doyle of the decision a few weeks before the episode was filmed.

Cast

Main cast
 Christopher Meloni as Senior Detective Elliot Stabler
 Mariska Hargitay as Junior Detective Olivia Benson
 Richard Belzer as Senior Detective Sergeant John Munch
 Ice-T as Junior Detective Odafin "Fin" Tutuola
 Michaela McManus as Assistant District Attorney Kim Greylek (episodes 1–15)
 BD Wong as FBI Special Agent Dr. George Huang
 Tamara Tunie as Medical Examiner Dr. Melinda Warner
 Dann Florek as Captain Donald "Don" Cragen

Special guest starring
 Stephanie March as Assistant District Attorney Alexandra Cabot (episodes 15–21)

Recurring cast

 Mike Doyle as Crime Scene Unit Forensics Technician Ryan O'Halloran
 Noel Fisher as Crime Scene Unit Forensics Technician Dale Stuckey
 Amir Arison as Dr. Manning
 Joel de la Fuente as Technical Assistance Response Unit Technician Ruben Morales
 John Cullum as Judge Barry Moredock
 Joanna Merlin as Judge Lena Petrovsky
 Allison Siko as Kathleen Stabler
 Lindsay Crouse as Judge D. Andrews
 Stephen Gregory as Dr. Kyle Beresford
 David Lipman as Judge Arthur Cohen
 Judith Light as Executive Assistant District Attorney / Judge Elizabeth Donnelly

 David Thornton as Defense Attorney Lionel Granger
 Peter Hermann as Defense Attorney Trevor Langan
 Deep Katdare as Dr. Parnell
 Alex Kingston as Defense Attorney Miranda Pond
 Audrie J. Neenan as Judge Lois Preston
 Caren Browning as Crime Scene Unit Captain Judith Siper
 Isabel Gillies as Kathy Stabler
 Lizette Carrion as Assistant District Attorney Kristen Torres
 Kelly Bishop as Defense Attorney Julia Zimmer.
 Viola Davis as Defense Attorney Donna Emmett

Guest stars

The premiere episode "Trials" stars Sara Gilbert as a rape victim who has given up her child and Luke Perry and Julie Bowen as the foster parents who begin taking care of him. When interviewed about his character, Perry stated that "there are always moments when you gotta find the humanity to people who may be considered the bad guy." Gilbert mentioned being a fan of the show and said "People know me more for comedy, I think, so it's always exciting to me when I get to play something so dramatic." For the role of the foster child, the directors held auditions in New York and Los Angeles before casting Jae Head. In the same episode, Mary Beth Evans briefly appeared as a doctor. She said that the head of NBC daytime "wanted to make Days of Our Lives less of an island and get people from our show onto other NBC shows." In the third episode "Swing", Ellen Burstyn portrayed Bernadette Stabler, Elliot Stabler's mother who suffers from bipolar disorder. She won a Primetime Emmy Award for Outstanding Guest Actress in a Drama Series for the role.

The fourth episode "Lunacy" was the first filmed in the season and starred James Brolin as an astronaut who used to be one of Stabler's role models. Kristina Klebe played an astronaut who is murdered and Chris Elliott played an enthusiast who follows them around. Christopher Meloni, who stars as Elliot Stabler, joked "Could there be a more confusing actor to have on this show than someone named Chris Elliott?" The following episode "Retro" which criticized the AIDS denialism movement previously had a working title of "Deniers". It was advertised as being "a big Tamara Tunie episode." Tunie was asked about Martin Mull's character in an interview. She answered "What's frightening is that his argument can sound sane. And Martin is smart enough to make one pause." The sixth episode "Babes" starred actor and singer Jesse McCartney as a chastity advocate. He commented that the role took him into new territory, saying "I play a murder suspect, a super-Catholic conservative white boy.  It's definitely a stretch and a leap.  It's an emotional role."

The seventh episode "Wildlife" was promoted before the season began for an undercover scene that showed chemistry between Detectives Benson and Stabler. One of the animals shown in this episode was an eleven-month-old white handed gibbon named Kimba. His fictional species in the show was named the "white crested gibbon" because there was no way that a critically endangered black crested gibbon could be used in the filming.

The eighth episode "Persona" guest-starred Brenda Blethyn as Caroline Cresswell, a sympathetic fugitive who has been living under a pseudonym. She was nominated for an Outstanding Guest Actress Emmy for her performance. Michael Trucco played a rapist in the tenth episode "Smut". He mentioned a flurry of comments on his message board from Battlestar Galactica fans following his SVU appearance. Kelly Hu played one of his victims seen at the start of the episode. She blogged "I get to be the victim this time. Fun.", referring to her numerous previous roles as a police officer.

Bridger Zadina gave a widely acclaimed performance as a male-to-female transgender teen in "Transitions". He was one of over 200 child actors who auditioned for casting director Jonathan Strauss and appeared in Google's list of top 30 searches after the episode aired. "Transitions" was submitted for Emmy contention but not nominated. The following episode "Lead" featured the return of Stephanie March's character, ADA Alexandra Cabot. March expressed excitement about news that she would work with Judith Light again. When interviewed about the episode, Neal Baer said "I always like to play with the format and it also has flashbacks which we rarely do." The sixteenth episode "Ballerina" guest-starred Carol Burnett as retired dancer Birdie Sulloway. Many of the dancing credits her character mentions in the episode are in fact highlights of Burnett's dancing career. She received an Emmy nomination for Outstanding Guest Actress in a Drama Series for this episode.

The seventeenth episode "Hell" focused on the lives of child soldiers. Mike Colter portrayed a warlord named Joseph Serumaga. Verne Gay of News 12 Networks exclaimed that Colter's character was "played with scary... conviction." Cicely Tyson played an adoptive parent in the episode. According to Neal Baer, she was contracted to appear with short notice. The episode "Selfish" involved the discovery of a dead baby and the fact that her mother, played by Hilary Duff, covered it up. Initial reports about the episode claimed that it was a response to the Caylee Anthony case. However, Neal Baer cautioned viewers with "You may think it's something familiar, but it turns out it's not." The main focus of the episode is the trial of a mother who inadvertently caused the death of another child by not vaccinating her own child against measles. Neal Baer took a particular liking to this episode in a 2012 interview, saying "It raised this really interesting question about not only what is your responsibility to your own child but to the community of children. It made the show more complex than 'I know what's best for my child.'" In the season finale "Zebras", Carol Kane played John Munch's ex-wife, whom she previously played on Homicide: Life on the Street. About the reprisal, Neal Baer said "We're thrilled to have Gwen Munch return to her true love."

Episodes

References

Bibliography

External links
 Law & Order: Special Victims Unit Season 10 at TVGuide.com
 Law & Order: Special Victims Unit Season 10 – TV IV
 Season 10 episodes at IMDb.com

10
2008 American television seasons
2009 American television seasons
Bipolar disorder in fiction